This is a list of the 22 members of the European Parliament for the Czech Republic in the 2009 to 2014 session.

List

Party representation

Notes

2009
List
Czech Republic